The Mind Trust is a non-profit organization based in Indianapolis whose mission is to “dramatically improve public education for underserved students by empowering education entrepreneurs to develop or expand transformative education initiatives.”

History
The Mind Trust was founded in 2006 by Bart Peterson, the former Mayor of Indianapolis, and David Harris, Mayor Peterson's former charter schools director.  Bart Peterson is now board chair, David Harris is a board member, and VP, Brandon Brown is now The Mind Trust's CEO.  The Mind Trust is an outgrowth of the Mayor Peterson's charter schools initiative.  In 2001, the Mayor of Indianapolis became the nation's only mayor with the authority to charter schools.  In July 2006, the initiative won Harvard University’s Innovations in American Government Award.

The summer 2007 issue of Education Next, a publication of the Hoover Institution described The Mind Trust's formation in an article by David Skinner:

Programs
To achieve its mission, The Mind Trust has three strategies: (1) the Education Entrepreneur Fellowship that serves as an incubator for transformative education ventures; (2) a Venture Fund to recruit to Indianapolis the nation's most successful entrepreneurial education initiatives; and (3) a Charter School Incubator that awards $1,000,000 in funding as well as support and training to leadership teams who intend to start networks of charter schools in Indianapolis.

The Education Entrepreneur Fellowship offers promising education entrepreneurs the opportunity to develop and launch their break-the-mold education ventures.  Fellows receive two years of support ($90,000 per year in salary, full benefits, a $20,000 stipend, etc.)  The Mind Trust has selected six Fellows since its inception.  Fellows and their programs include Dr. Michael Bitz and Youth Music Exchange, Dr. Celine Coggins and Teach Plus, Ms. Abigail Falik and Global Citizen Year, Earl Martin Phalen and Summer Advantage USA, Stephanie Saroki de Garcia and Seton Education Partners, and Jesse Hahnel and FosterEd. John Ketzenberger, the business columnist for the Indianapolis Star, wrote about the Fellowship in a column on May 20, 2008:

The Mind Trust has used the Venture Fund to bring Teach For America, The New Teacher Project, pilotED Schools, College Summit Diploma Plus, and Stand for Children to Indianapolis.  The Mind Trust has invested over $5 million in the organizations they have recruited through the Venture Fund.

The Charter School Incubator is the newest initiative of The Mind Trust.  In 2012 the Incubator will award three to four $1,000,000 start-up grants to leadership teams that intend to launch networks of charter schools in Indianapolis.  The deadline for the first application round is February 17, 2012, and awards will be made by June 2012.  The editorial staff of the Indianapolis Business Journal wrote about the Incubator in a column on October 15, 2011:

References

External links

Organizations established in 2006
Educational organizations based in the United States
Non-profit organizations based in Indianapolis